Rubus ortivus is uncommon North American species of brambles in the rose family. It grows in the northeastern United States (Maine) and eastern Canada (Nova Scotia, New Brunswick).

The genetics of Rubus is extremely complex, so that it is difficult to decide on which groups should be recognized as species. There are many rare species with limited ranges such as this. Further study is suggested to clarify the taxonomy.

References

ortivus
Plants described in 1934
Flora of Nova Scotia
Flora of Maine
Flora of New Brunswick
Flora without expected TNC conservation status